The 2nd European Cross Country Championships were held at Alnwick in England on 2 December 1995. Paulo Guerra took his second title in the men's competition and Annemari Sandell won the women's race.

Results

Men individual 9km

103 runners finished.

Men teams

Total 20 teams

Women individual 4.3 km

79 runners finished.

Women teams

Total 17 teams

References

External links 
 Database containing all results between 1994–2007

Alnwick
European Cross Country Championships
European Cross Country Championships
1995 in English sport
International athletics competitions hosted by England
Cross country running in the United Kingdom
December 1995 sports events in the United Kingdom